"We're Going Home" is a song by Australian singer-songwriter Vance Joy and released on 12 January 2018 as the third single from Joy's second studio album Nation of Two.

Joy told Triple J's Ben & Liam the song was written whilst on tour in the US opening for Taylor Swift. Joy said: "It's a song that took me by my surprise. It's about stepping out into the unknown and finding out what you're made of, which I did a bit on that tour. I was definitely scared opening up shows for Taylor Swift. It was kinda scary but I'm glad this song arrived."

At the APRA Music Awards of 2019, the song was nominated for Most Played Australian Work and Pop Work of the Year.

Video
The video was directed by Mimi Cave and was released on 10 January 2018.

Dancers:  Kent Boyd, Sarah Butler, Shauna Davis, Jessica Franco, Sarah Printz, Gary Reagan and Pia Vinson

Reception
Tyler Jenke from Tone Deaf said: "A tender, emotional track that showcases Vance Joy at his finest. "We're Going Home" has that rare quality of being an introspective, poignant tune that features a huge chorus; perfect for reflection, or for belting out from the front row of one of his concerts."

Charts

Weekly charts

Year-end charts

Certifications

References

2018 singles
2017 songs
Vance Joy songs
Songs written by Dan Wilson (musician)
Songs written by Vance Joy